Kistimaat is a 2014 Bangladeshi action film directed by Ashiqur Rahman and produced by Tiger Media Limited and The Abhi Pictures. The film features Arifin Shuvoo and Achol Akhe in lead roles while Misha Sawdagor plays the main antagonist in the film. The film is about a police officer and his fight against corruption. The film was released on Eid-ul-Adha, 6 October 2014, and was a commercial success.

Plot
The story is about Durjoy (Arifin Shuvoo), a ruthless and arrogant police officer who does what he believes is right. He is attracted toward Piya (Achol) thinks Durjoy is a gangster but still has a soft spot for him in her heart. One day, Lion Robi (Misha Sawdagor), a big organized crime syndicate tries to strike a deal with Durjoy but fails as Durjoy insults him. Raged in Anger, Lion Robi promises to make Durjoy's life difficult and destroy the structure of Police force.

Both Durjoy and Piya, both are unable to express their love to each other until one day, when Lion Robi's brother Tiger Robi enters the love story and tries to marry Piya forcefully. Knowing that, Durjoy raged in anger, mercilessly Kills Tiger Robi. After finding out about death of his brother, Lion Robi vows to kill Durjoy and begins by killing Durjoy's allies in the police department. Before death, the police commissioner reveals to Durjoy that his father was once a police commissioner until murdered by Lion Robi for not assisting in his illegal businesses. In the end of the film, Durjoy kills Lion Robi, destroys all his illegal organizations. The film ends showing both Durjoy and Piya happily living their remaining life.

Cast
 Arifin Shuvoo as Durjoy Chowdhury, a police officer and the main protagonist of the film.
 Achol as Piya, Durjoy's love interest and an aspiring actress.
 Misha Sawdagor as Lion Robi, leader of a large criminal organization and the main antagonist of the film
 Tiger Robi and himself, owner of a film production company and brother of Lion Robi
 Subrata as Durjoy's father, a former police officer
 Rebeka Rouf as Durjoy's mother
 Kaniz as Momota, Durjoy's sister
 Afzal Sharif as Mia Moti, a corrupt police officer allied with Lion Robi, later joins Durjoy
 Harun Kisinger
 Mirakkel Shojol
 Habib Khan
 Kamal Patekar
 Jadu Azad

Music

The film includes a total of five songs written by Zahid Hasan Abhi and features Imran, Porshi, Puja, Kona and others as playback singers. The songs are composed by Shouquat Ali Imon, Imran, Naved and Shochi Sams.

See also
 Cinema of Bangladesh

References

Further reading

External links
 
 Kistimaat on Bangla Movie Database

2014 films
2010s romantic action films
Bengali-language Bangladeshi films
Bangladeshi romantic action films
Films scored by Imran Mahmudul
Films scored by Shawkat Ali Emon
2010s Bengali-language films
Bangladeshi remakes of Indian films